Grossmont Transit Center is a San Diego Trolley station located next to Grossmont Center in La Mesa, California. The station is served by the Green Line and Orange Line and is located just east of the junction between the two lines. The station serves a variety of residences, a dense commercial area, Sharp Grossmont Hospital, and has a park and ride commuter lot.

History
Green Line service began in July 2005, when the segment connecting to  first opened.

An improvement project broke ground on February 17, 2010, to add elevators and a pedestrian bridge to the station, which was completed and began operation on November 19, 2011.

Station layout
There are two tracks, each served by a side platform.

See also
 List of San Diego Trolley stations

References

Green Line (San Diego Trolley)
Orange Line (San Diego Trolley)
San Diego Trolley stations
La Mesa, California
Railway stations in the United States opened in 1989
1989 establishments in California